Imae-dong (이매동, 二梅洞) is a Bundang neighborhood in the city of Seongnam, Gyeonggi Province. It is officially divided into Imae-1-dong and Imae-2-dong. It shares its name with a station on the Bundang Line.

Bundang
Neighbourhoods in South Korea